Morpho helena, the Helena morpho, is a Neotropical butterfly of the family Nymphalidae. It is found in the rainforests of northern South America.

It is known for its metallic blue and shiny wings. Many authorities consider Morpho helena a subspecies of Morpho rhetenor, and thus is sometimes named Morpho rhetenor helena.

External links
 Butterflies of America – Images of type and other specimens.

Morpho
Fauna of Brazil
Nymphalidae of South America